Great king, and the equivalent in many languages, refers to historical titles of certain monarchs, suggesting an elevated status among the host of kings and princes. This title is most usually associated with the shahanshah (shah of shahs, i.e. king of kings, indeed translated from Greek as basileus tōn basileōn, later adopted by the Byzantine emperors) of Persia under the Achaemenid dynasty whose vast empire in Asia lasted for 200 years up to the year 330 BC, which was later adopted by successors of the Achaemenid Empire whose monarchial names were also succeeded by "the great". In comparison, "high king" was used by ancient rulers in Great Britain and Ireland, as well as Greece.

In the 2nd millennium BC Near East, there was a tradition of reciprocally using such addresses between powers, as a way of diplomatically recognizing each other as an equal. Only the kings of countries who were not subject to any other king and powerful enough to draw the respect from their adversaries were allowed to use the title of "great king". Those were the kings of Egypt, Yamhad, Hatti, Babylonia, Mitanni (until its demise in the 14th century), Assyria (only after the demise of Mitanni), and for a brief time the Myceneans. Great kings referred to each other as brothers and often established close relationships by means of marriages and frequent gift exchanges. Letters exchanged between these rulers, several of which have been recovered especially in Amarna and Hittite archives, provide details of this diplomacy.

The case of maharaja ("great raja", great king and prince, in Sanskrit and Hindi) on the Indian subcontinent, originally reserved for the regional hegemon such as the Gupta, is an example of how such a lofty style can get caught in a cycle of devaluation by "title inflation" as ever more, mostly less powerful rulers adopt the style. This is often followed by the emergence of one or more new, more exclusive and prestigious styles, as, in this case, maharajadhiraja (great king of kings"). The Turkic-Mongol title khan also came to be "augmented" to tiles like chagan or hakan, meaning "khan of khans", i.e. equivalent to king of kings.

The aforementioned Indian style maharajadhiraja is also an example of an alternative semantic title for similar "higher" royal styles such as King of Kings. Alternatively, a more idiomatic style may develop into an equally prestigious tradition of titles, because of the shining example of the original – thus, various styles of emperors trace back to the Roman imperator (strictly speaking a republican military honorific), or the family surname Caesar (turned into an imperial title since Diocletian's tetrarchy).Unlike his predecessors Chandragupta I, who were known as Maharaja (king), he came to be known as Maharajadhiraja (king of kings).

As the conventional use of king and its equivalents to render various other monarchical styles illustrates, there are many roughly equivalent styles, each of which may spawn a "great X" variant, either unique or becoming a rank in a corresponding tradition; in this context, "grand" is equivalent to "great" and sometimes interchangeable if convention does not firmly prescribe one of the two. Examples include grand duke and German Grosswojwod.

Examples

Antiochus III the Great, Hellenistic Greek king and the sixth ruler of the Seleucid Empire, bore the title Basileus Megas
In medieval Serbia, Stefan the First-Crowned, likely Stefan Uroš I, Stefan Dečanski and Stefan Dušan had the title of "great king" (Велики краљ/Veliki kralj)

See also 
 Great Catholic Monarch
 Katechon
 Shahryar

References 

2nd-millennium BC introductions
Achaemenid Empire
Mythological kings
Prophecy
Royal titles
Titles in Iran
Titles of national or ethnic leadership